Gordon Craig was a British actor.

Selected filmography
 Consequences (1918)
 The Double Life of Mr. Alfred Burton (1919)
 The Breed of the Treshams (1920)
 Uncle Dick's Darling (1920)
 A Bachelor Husband (1920)
 Christie Johnstone (1921)
 The Door That Has No Key (1921)
 The Headmaster (1921)
 The Glorious Adventure (1922)
 Miriam Rozella (1924)
 Dawn (1928)
 Take a Powder (1953)

External links
 

Year of birth missing
Year of death missing
British male film actors
British male silent film actors
20th-century British male actors
Place of birth missing
Place of death missing